Ben Joseph Jackson (born 22 February 2001) is an English professional footballer who plays as a left-back for Championship side Huddersfield Town.

Career
Born in Stockport, Jackson joined Huddersfield Town at under-15 level. He moved on loan to Darlington in March 2019 where he played seven games. He then joined his hometown club, Stockport County, on loan, where he played 26 games over two spells during the 2019–20 season.

Jackson made his senior debut for Huddersfield on 5 September 2020, when he played in their EFL Cup defeat against Rochdale.

On 16 January 2021, Jackson joined League Two side Bolton Wanderers on loan until the end of the season. He made his debut the same day, starting in a 1–1 draw against Cheltenham Town. His first goal came on 24 April when he scored the only goal in Bolton's 1–0 win against Morecambe. He helped the Trotters to win promotion to League One, appearing in five matches in total.

On 28 January 2022, Jackson signed for League One club Doncaster Rovers on loan, until the end of the season.

Personal life
Jackson is half-Scottish.

Career statistics

Honours
Bolton Wanderers
EFL League Two third-place (promotion): 2020–21

References

2001 births
Living people
Footballers from Stockport
English footballers
Association football midfielders
Huddersfield Town A.F.C. players
Darlington F.C. players
Stockport County F.C. players
Bolton Wanderers F.C. players
English Football League players
National League (English football) players
English people of Scottish descent